Trevor Morgan may refer to:

 Trevor Morgan (actor) (born 1986), American actor
 Trevor Morgan (footballer) (born 1956), English footballer
 J. Trevor Morgan (1923–1989), member of the Canadian House of Commons
 Trevor Morgan (EastEnders), a character in the British soap opera EastEnders